Catacombs of the Black Vatican is the ninth studio album by heavy metal band Black Label Society. The album was released in the UK on April 7, 2014, and in the US on April 8. It is the only Black Label Society album to feature former Breaking Benjamin drummer Chad Szeliga after fill-in Mike Froedge departed the band. Froedge himself replaced Will Hunt, who in turn replaced longtime drummer Craig Nunenmacher, all in the span of fewer than two years.

Reception

The album debuted at No. 5 on Billboard 200, and No. 1 on Top Rock Albums. with around 25,000 copies sold in its first week. The album has sold 80,000 copies in the US as of March 2016.

Track listing

Personnel
Zakk Wylde – guitars, lead vocals, piano, acoustic guitar
John DeServio – bass, backing vocals
Chad Szeliga – drums

Charts

References

2014 albums
Black Label Society albums
MNRK Music Group albums
Mascot Records albums